Jayabaya University is a private university in Jakarta, precisely on Jalan Pulomas Selatan Kav 23, East Jakarta. Founded on October 5, 1958 by Prof. Dr. Moeslim Taher when he was 24 years old. Currently the Rector of Jayabaya University is held by Prof. H. Amir Santoso, Ph.D.

History
At the beginning of its establishment, Jayabaya University began by managing two faculties, namely the Faculty of Law and the Faculty of Economics with a total of eleven students. The first rector appointed was Prof. Mr. A A. Hakim who simultaneously served as Dean of the Faculty of Law.

Then in 1961/1962 the rector of Jayabaya University was handed over to Prof. Dr. H. Moeslim Taher, SH. as the second rector served from 1962 to 1988. He was replaced by Prof. Dr. H. Tb. Achjani Atmakusuma as acting rector in 1988, officially served as Chancellor from 1989 to 1996.

Then he was replaced by Ir. Syamsu Anwar, MS from 1996 to 2000. Then from 2000 he was replaced by Prof. Dr. H.R. Taufik Sri Soemantri Martosoewignyo, SH and in September 2008 was led by Prof. H. Amir Santoso, Phd.

Faculties
Jayabaya University has 8 faculties, namely:
 Faculty of Economics
 Faculty of Law
 Faculty of Social Science and Political Science
 Faculty of Information and Computer Management
 Faculty of Psychology
 Faculty of Communication
 Faculty of Civil Engineering and Planning
 Faculty of Industrial  Technology

Jayabaya Foundation
To explore and develop funding sources for the development of Jayabaya University, the Jayabaya Foundation was formed, which was confirmed by Liem Toeng Kie Notarial Deed in Jakarta Number 17 on October 6, 1960, and amended by Notary Deed Muhamad Said Tadjoedin in Jakarta, Number 221 dated August 17, 1983, and copied by Notary Haji Abdul Kadir Usman on March 21, 1997. It was noted that the founders were Moeslim Taher and Yuyun Moeslim Taher.

Address of campus building
Jayabaya University has 2 buildings, namely:
 Campus A is located at Jalan Pulomas Selatan Kav 23 East Jakarta. Administrative Center (Rectorat), Faculty of Law, Faculty of Economics, Faculty of Social and Political Sciences, Faculty of Information and Computer Management, Faculty of Psychology, Faculty of Communication Sciences.
 Campus C is located on Jalan Raya Bogor Km. 28 Cimanggis East Jakarta. Faculty of Industrial Technology with the Department of Mechanical Engineering, Electrical Engineering, and Chemical Engineering. The Faculty of Civil Engineering and Planning fosters 2 (two) departments, namely the Department of Civil Engineering and the Department of Architecture.

Notable alumni
 Eggi Sudjana, Indonesian activist
 Ikke Nurjanah, Indonesian dangdut singer
 Iti Octavia Jayabaya, Regent of Lebak Regency
 Malam Sambat Kaban, former Minister of Forestry of the Republic of Indonesia
 Moeslim Taher, founder of Jayabaya University
 Sylviana Murni, former Deputy Governor of Jakarta candidate

References

Bibliography

External links
 Official website

Universities in Jakarta
East Jakarta